|}

The Winter Hill Stakes is a Group 3 flat horse race in Great Britain open to horses aged three years or older. It is run at Windsor over a distance of 1 mile and 2 furlongs (2,012 metres), and it is scheduled to take place each year in August.

For a period the event was classed at Listed level. It was promoted to Group 3 status in 1995, and is currently the only Group race usually held at Windsor.

The venue stages regular evening meetings throughout the summer, and the Winter Hill Stakes is the feature race on the final day.

Records
Most successful horse since 1986 (3 wins):
 Annus Mirabilis – 1996, 1997, 1998

Leading jockey since 1986 (5 wins):
 Frankie Dettori – Annus Mirabilis (1996, 1997), Naheef (2002), Campanologist (2009), Planteur (2013)

Leading trainer since 1986 (9 wins):

 Sir Michael Stoute – Samarid (1986), Dolpour (1989), Desert Shot (1995), Adilabad (2000, 2001), Tam Lin (2006), Queen's Best (2007), Solid Stone (2021), Regal Reality (2022)

Winners since 1986

See also
 Horse racing in Great Britain
 List of British flat horse races

References
 Racing Post:
 galopp-sieger.de – Winter Hill Stakes.
 horseracingintfed.com – International Federation of Horseracing Authorities – Winter Hill Stakes (2018).
 pedigreequery.com – Winter Hill Stakes – Windsor.

Flat races in Great Britain
Windsor Racecourse
Open middle distance horse races